The 2015–16 Green Bay Phoenix men's basketball team represented the University of Wisconsin–Green Bay in the 2015–16 NCAA Division I men's basketball season. Their head coach in his first year was Linc Darner. The Phoenix played their home games at the Resch Center and were members of the Horizon League. They finished the season 23–13, 11–7 in Horizon League play to finish in fourth place. They defeated Cleveland State, Milwaukee, Valparaiso, and Wright State to become champions of the Horizon League tournament. They received the conference's automatic bid to the NCAA tournament where they lost in the first round to Texas A&M.

Roster

Schedule

|-
!colspan=9 style="background:#006633; color:#FFFFFF;"|  Exhibition

|-
!colspan=9 style="background:#006633; color:#FFFFFF;"|  Non-Conference regular season

|-
!colspan=9 style="background:#006633; color:#FFFFFF;"|  Horizon League regular season

|-
!colspan=9 style="background:#006633; color:#FFFFFF;"|Horizon League tournament

|-
!colspan=9 style="background:#006633; color:#FFFFFF;"|NCAA tournament

References

Green Bay Phoenix
Green Bay Phoenix men's basketball seasons
Green Bay Phoenix men's b
Green Bay Phoenix men's b
Green Bay